Doug Libla (born 1952) is a former Republican member of the Missouri Senate, representing the southeasternmost part of the state. He was first elected to that position in 2012, receiving 56% of the vote over Democratic candidate Terry Swinger.  He was reelected in 2016 over former U.S Congressman Bill Burlison.

Libla was mentioned as a possible contender in the 2013 special congressional election, but ultimately decided not to run.

Personal life
Libla was born in 1952 to Clyde and Margie Libla. He and his wife, Elaine, have one daughter; Cassie. They reside in Poplar Bluff, Missouri.

Electoral history

State Senate

References

External links
 
 Campaign website
 Legislative website

1952 births
People from Wayne County, Missouri
People from Poplar Bluff, Missouri
Living people
Three Rivers College (Missouri)
Republican Party Missouri state senators
21st-century American politicians